Olesya Aleksandrovna Forsheva (née Krasnomovets on 8 July 1979) is a retired Russian sprint runner who specialized in the 400 m and 4×400 m relay. She had her best achievements indoors, placing first or second in her both events at the world championships in 2004 and 2006 and at the European championships in 2011. Her 4×400 m teams set two world indoor records, in 2004 and 2006, but only the former one was ratified. Outdoors she won the world 4×400 m title in 2005 and placed second at the 2004 Olympics.

Personal life 
She is married to the fellow sprinter Dmitry Forshev.

References

1979 births
Living people
People from Nizhny Tagil
Russian female sprinters
Athletes (track and field) at the 2004 Summer Olympics
Olympic athletes of Russia
Olympic silver medalists for Russia
World Athletics Championships medalists
Medalists at the 2004 Summer Olympics
Olympic silver medalists in athletics (track and field)
World Athletics indoor record holders (relay)
World Athletics Indoor Championships winners
World Athletics Indoor Championships medalists
World Athletics Championships winners
Sportspeople from Sverdlovsk Oblast
20th-century Russian women
21st-century Russian women